Glory (translit. Slava) is a 2016 Bulgarian drama film written and directed by Kristina Grozeva and Petar Valchanov. The second film in the directors' "newspaper-clippings trilogy", the film is a social-realist parable exploring the themes of corruption, class differences, and the rural-urban divide, in contemporary Bulgarian society. It was selected as the Bulgarian entry for the Best Foreign Language Film at the 90th Academy Awards, but it was not nominated.

Plot
Railway trackman Tsanko Petrov discovers a large amount of money in bundles on the tracks, but instead of taking the cash for himself he notifies the authorities. The sophisticated head of PR at Bulgaria's Ministry of Transport, Julia Staykova, takes the opportunity to deflect a brewing corruption scandal by holding a ceremony to hail Tsanko as a working-class hero. Unkempt and dishevelled with a debilitating stutter, Tsanko is ridiculed by Julia's PR team while they parade him for the press as a hero. In order for the Minister to present Tsanko with a new digital watch, Julia removes Tsanko's own Slava-brand watch, an heirloom passed down from his father. However, she then loses it, ignores him when he tries to contact her, and finally replaces the watch with a fake.

In anger, Tsanko goes to the press and exposes the corruption and theft that is endemic in the transportation ministry, and the Minister's complicity in the crime.

In an attempt to save the ministry, Julia arranges for Tsanko to be framed for a crime he did not commit. He is then coerced into retracting his earlier accusations, in exchange for release from prison. On his way home, he is accosted by his co-workers, who are angry with him for exposing their crime ring. It is also implied that Tsanko's beloved rabbits had died from neglect, due to his long absence while in prison.

The following day, Julia reads in the newspaper that a trackman had committed suicide. Racked with guilt for her role in causing the death of a good man, she gets drunk and searches her office desperately for the missing watch. The following morning, she both finds the watch, and receives word that the dead trackman is actually not Tsanko. Feeling relieved, she drives to his home to return the watch personally. Whereupon she finds a severely injured Tsanko, furious with her for having triggered the entire chain of events. The movie ends with a glimpse of Tsanko grabbing his wrench and Julia screaming, while her oblivious husband sits in their car nearby listening to music.

Cast
  as Tsanko Petrov
 Margita Gosheva as Julia Staykova
  as Valeri
 Milko Lazarov as Kiril Kolev
 Georgi Stamenov as Doctor
 Ivan Savov as Minister Kanchev
 Mira Iskarova as Galya
 Hristofor Nedkov as Porter

Development
An event reported in the Bulgarian press inspired the film. One of the film's directors (Petar Valchanov) stated in an interview:

In another interview, the directors elaborated that in constructing the screenplay of the film, they take the superficial parts of real-life stories reported in the news media. A separate real-life event that the directors incorporated into Glory was an incident where an architect is forced to apologize.

Production
The film, originally known as The Pledge, was scheduled to film in July–August 2015, in Sofia and surrounding villages. The budget was reported as €260,000, including a €190,000 grant from the Bulgarian National Film Center.

Release
Relying on the strength of the directors' previous film, Italy's I Wonder Pictures bought the film in February 2016, while Glory was in post-production, Distribution rights for the film were later sold to Filmarti (Turkey), Arti Film (Benelux), La Aventura Audiovisual (Spain), JSC Europos Kinas (Lithuania), Bounty Films (Australia and New Zealand), and Film Movement (United States and English-speaking Canada).

The film had its world premiere at the 2016 Locarno International Film Festival (in Switzerland).

Reception
The film holds a score of 84 out of 100 on Metacritic indicating "universal acclaim".

Accolades
At the 2016 Locarno International Film Festival, Glory received a special mention from the International Federation of Film Societies (FICC/IFFS) jury.

At the Golden Rose Bulgarian Feature Film Festival in September 2016, Glory won the Special Award of the City of Varna, the Best Screenwriter Award, the Best Cinematographer Award (to Krum Rodriguez for his work on both Glory and Godless), the Union of Bulgarian Filmmakers Award, and the Accredited Journalists' Award.

The film won the top prize at the 2016 Hamptons International Film Festival, the HIFF Award for Best Narrative Feature Film, consisting of a film production-services package worth more than $125,000 along with a $3,000 cash prize.

At the 2016 KineNova film festival in Skopje, Glory won the best film award.

At Film Fest Gent in October 2016, Glory was in official competition and received a special mention from the jury, which said it admired the film "for its humor and its political and moral honesty".

In the 15th edition of Tirana International Film Festival, Glory won the Best Feature Film.

Best International Feature Film , Edinburgh International Film Festival 2017

See also
Stuttering in popular culture
The Lesson (2014 Bulgarian film)
 List of submissions to the 90th Academy Awards for Best Foreign Language Film
 List of Bulgarian submissions for the Academy Award for Best Foreign Language Film

References

External links
 
 

2016 films
2010s political drama films
Greek drama films
Bulgarian drama films
2010s Bulgarian-language films
Films set in Bulgaria
Films shot in Bulgaria
Rail transport films
2016 drama films